Matthew ( 1363 – 1398) was a count of Foix an viscount of Béarn. In 1391. he succeeded Gaston Phoebus, his first cousin once removed, as count. He asserted the sovereignty of Béarn and, as son-in-law of John I, contested the Crown of Aragon with John's brother Martin I from 1396. He and his wife, Joanna, had no children.

Accession to office 
Despite his pursuit for sovereignty, Gaston Phoebus ultimately bequeathed the lordship of Béarn to the king of France. On 8 August 1391, Béarnese leaders duly gathered in Orthez and designated representatives, establishing the Estates-General of Béarn. 

They also elected Matthew de Castellbo as new legitimate lord of Béarn, also imposing on him the need to obtain from the king of France, Charles VI, the renunciation of the recent Treaty of Toulouse whereby the French monarch would gain access to the lordship of Béarn. Matthew manoeuvred quickly in this respect, obtaining early on his recognition by Richard II, king of England, and Charles VI, king of France, as lord of Béarn.

References 

|-

|-

|-

1360s births
1398 deaths
14th-century Princes of Andorra
House of Foix
Counts of Foix
Viscounts of Béarn
Viscounts of Lautrec
14th-century French people
14th-century people from the Kingdom of Aragon
Christians of the Barbary Crusade